C. truncata may refer to:
 Callyspongia truncata, a demosponge species
 Cyanea truncata, a flowering plant species